Kathryn Zenna (born February 25, 1971 in Montreal, Quebec), sometimes credited as Kate Zenna, is a Canadian film and television actress. She is best known for her roles as Veronica in the film Jack and Jill, for which she garnered a Genie Award nomination for Best Supporting Actress at the 20th Genie Awards, and as Mel in Train 48.

Career 
Zenna appeared in the films Love Is Work and Ramona and Beezus, and as a guest actor in the television series Earth: Final Conflict, Twice in a Lifetime, Nikita, A Nero Wolfe Mystery, Puppets Who Kill, The Eleventh Hour, Queer as Folk, Show Me Yours, G-Spot, Psych, Brothers and Sisters and The Fosters.

Filmography

Film

Television

References

External links

1971 births
Canadian film actresses
Canadian television actresses
Actresses from Montreal
Living people